The Carlos Palanca Memorial Awards for Literature winners in the year 1978 (rank, title of winning entry, name of author).


English division
Short story
First prize: “Waywaya” by Francisco Sionil Jose
Second prize: “Sunday Morning” by Rowena Tiempo Torrevillas
Third prize: “Borrowed Time” by Luis Teodoro Jr.

Poetry
First prize: “15 Poems” by Alfred A. Yuson; and “Icon Corner” by Alfred A. Yuson
Second prize: “Point of View” by Luis Francia; and “The Dugging Years” by Jolica Cuadra
Third prize: “Rule Acrobat from Planet F” by Ricardo Trinidad; and “The Kayumanggi Cycle” by
Jose Carreon

One-act play
First prize: “Vigil” by Bobby Flores Villasis
Second prize: “Idiot Boy” by Herminia Sison
Third prize: No winner
Special mention  “Hatchet Club” by Paul Stephen Lim; and “Sundered Selves” by Elsa M. Coscolluela

Full-length play
First prize: “Exit No Exit” by Jesus T. Peralta
Second prize: “Katalona” by Elsa M. Coscolluela
Third prize: “A Tale of Two Houses” by Mig Alvarez Enriquez

Filipino division
Short story
First prize: “” by Lilia Quindoza Santiago
Second prize: “” by Rosauro Dela Cruz
Third prize: “” by Jun Cruz Reyes

Poetry
First prize: 
Second prize: “” by Lamberto E. Antonio
Third prize: “” by Rosauro Dela Cruz
Special mention “” by Bienvenido Ramos; “” by Rolando Bartolome; “” by Rolando Natividad; “” by Eli Ang Barroso; and “” by Miguel Arguelles

One-act play
First prize: “” by Manuel Pambid
Second prize: “” by Antonio Victor Reyes
Third prize: “” by Dong Delos Reyes

Full-length play
First prize: “” by Edgardo B. Maranan
Second prize: “” by Benjamin P. Pascual
Third prize: “” by Bienvenido Noriega Jr.

References
 

Palanca Awards
1978 literary awards